Sam Roman, known by his stage name Romans (stylised as RØMANS), is an English singer, songwriter and record producer. He first gained mainstream recognition after being featured on Naughty Boy's "Home" and penning "My Loving," "Long Hard Look" and "Doubt" for Mary J. Blige, which were released on her thirteenth studio album, The London Sessions. Other artists he has penned for include Demi Lovato, Alicia Keys, John Legend, Elton John, Clean Bandit, Jonas Blue, AlunaGeorge, Disclosure, Claudia Leitte, Little Mix, DNCE, Ella Mai and more.

Early life
Romans was born in Pinner, Middlesex, which also is the birthplace and childhood residence of Elton John, whom he cites as one of his key-influences. He attended Orley Farm Prep School, Harrow where he was taught, amongst other music, the piano. He also taught himself to play guitar, cello, piano, drums, and saxophone, as well as teaching himself how to produce. His first gig was the Northwood Hills hotel at the age of 13 (the same venue as Elton John's first show), and he left school at 16 to pursue music full-time.

Career
His music style has been described as a mix of soul, pop and hip-hop. His early career included the release of numerous singles in the United Kingdom. In July 2014, RØMANS was featured on "Home" off Naughty Boy's debut-album, Hotel Cabana, their collaboration was released as a single. On 6 May 2014, it was announced that he had signed a record deal with Roc Nation.

Having previously focussed on EPs, 2016's Silence and 2017's Automatic, his third and fourth releases overall, received radio support from BBC Radio 1's Annie Mac, Clara Amfo and Toddla T, as well as 1Xtra's MistaJam and DJ Target. Rarely performing live, he played The Fader's infamous Fader Fort stage at SXSW and has continued to receive support from the publication, along with other tastemakers including Spin, Wonderland, Pigeons & Planes and The Line Of Best Fit.

He sees his own music as a creative necessity that complements the process of his songwriting career. "If I do a month of writing with other people I’m suddenly like, ‘Right, I need to just go home, be on my own, and play some fucking weird guitar shit,’” he explains. “I think it’s also partly because there’s a natural frustration there as a writer: a lot of stuff gets wasted and sits on hard drives forever. I couldn’t just write for other people and do the conveyor belt of songwriting if I didn’t have an area where I can make things to my taste". His latest project PEOPLE which consists of nine records launched in August 2018 with the release of 'Glitter & Gold'.

Discography

EPs

Songs written

References

Year of birth missing (living people)
Living people
English male singer-songwriters
People from Pinner
Roc Nation artists